Tennys Sandgren was the defending champion, but lost to John Isner in the second round.

Ugo Humbert won his first title on the ATP Tour, defeating Benoît Paire in the final, 7–6(7–2), 3–6, 7–6(7–5).

Seeds

Draw

Finals

Top half

Bottom half

Qualifying

Seeds

Qualifiers

Lucky loser

Qualifying draw

First qualifier

Second qualifier

Third qualifier

Fourth qualifier

References

External links
 Main draw
 Qualifying draw

ASB Classic
2020 Singles